Manoa Falls is a 150-foot waterfall along the Manoa Falls Trail in Honolulu, Hawaii. Swimming in the pool below the waterfall is highly discouraged because there is a threat of becoming infected with Leptospirosis, a disease causing mild to moderate flulike symptoms that can last for 1 to 2 weeks. Many tourists are attracted to the waterfall and the scenery throughout the trail leading to it. Another attraction near Manoa Falls is the Lyon Arboretum, which preserves many endangered Hawaiian plant species. The hike to Manoa Falls and back takes about one hour. The waterfall and surrounding area experience rainfall almost every day, and flash floods can occur.

Characteristics 
Manoa Falls is located on the island of Oahu in Honolulu, Hawaii in Manoa Valley. The Manoa Falls is a 150 foot waterfall that empties into a small pool of water. The waterfall is nestled in the mountains of Koolau in a tropical rainforest. Since the area surrounding the waterfall is considered a tropical rainforest, it is prone to heavy rainfall often making the ground damp and muddy The high amount of precipitation leads to a high amount of plant life near the falls. There is often less water in the waterfall during the summer months, which leaves peak tourism extending from summer to fall, before the rainy months of November–March.

Dangers

Leptospirosis 
Swimming in the pool at the bottom of the falls is discouraged. This is due both to occasional rockfalls and to the bacterial disease leptospirosis, which causes severe flu-like symptoms. Leptospirosis is found in freshwater and is common in tropical climates. In Hawaii, rats and mice often carry the disease and can easily transfer it to humans through their urine.

Deaths 
A 19 year old valedictorian from Kaiser High School, in Honolulu, Hawaii, died from falling from the top of Manoa Falls on June 15, 2016. Kirsti Takanishi died two days after the incident and the cause of death was determined to be from blunt force trauma to the head.

A 27 year old man died from falling from the top of Manoa Falls on December 17th, 2018.  The man's name has yet to be released.

Phillip Scott Mann fell from the top of the falls and died on April 11th 2012. His body wasn't found until around 2p.m. the following day April 12th. Cause of death was blunt force trauma from the almost 200ft fall. Phillip was from Scottsmoor, Florida, and moved to Hawaii in 2011.

Ecology 

The Lyon Arboretum is located in the Manoa Valley section of the Manoa Falls Trail. It contains over 5000 plant species. Some plant species included are heliconias, gingers, aroids, bromeliads, and some native Hawaiian plants. Many tourists visit the arboretum but some also go for research and academic purposes. It provides several different programs that develop innovations to restore endangered native Hawaiian plants.

Sources 
 

Waterfalls of Hawaii
Oahu
Landforms of Oahu
Tourist attractions in Honolulu County, Hawaii